The 1988–89 All-Ireland Senior Club Football Championship was the 19th staging of the All-Ireland Senior Club Football Championship since its establishment by the Gaelic Athletic Association in 1970-71.

St. Mary's Burren entered the championship as the defending champions, however, they were beaten by Clann na nGael in the All-Ireland semi-final.

On 17 March 1989, Nemo Rangers won the championship following a 1-13 to 1-03 defeat of Clann na nGael in the All-Ireland final at Croke Park. It was their fifth championship title overall and their first title since 1984.

Results

Munster Senior Club Football Championship

First round

Semi-finals

Final

All-Ireland Senior Club Football Championship

Quarter-final

Semi-finals

Final

Championship statistics

Miscellaneous

 Clann na nGael became the first team to win five successive Connacht Club Championship titles.
 Parnells won the Leinster Club Championship for the first time in their history.
 St. Mary's Burren became the first team to win five Ulster Club Championship titles.

References

1988 in Gaelic football
1989 in Gaelic football